Shaumyan, Shahumyan or Shaumian is an Armenian surname. Notable people with the surname include:

Sebastian Shaumyan (1916–2007), Armenian linguist
Stepan Shahumyan (1878–1918), Bolshevik commissar

Armenian-language surnames